Cirrhilabrus brunneus or the dusky fairy wrasse is a species of fairy wrasse native to the coasts off Borneo. It can be found at depths of 40–50 meters.

Description 
The fish can grow to a length of 4.4 centimeters. It has 11 dorsal spines, nine dorsal soft rays, 3 anal spines, and 9 anal soft rays. Males are brown or bronze. The fish also has 15 pectoral rays and two horizontal scale rows are present under the eyes.

References 

Fish described in 2006
Taxa named by Gerald R. Allen
Fish of Indonesia
brunneus